The second government of Adolfo Suárez was formed on 5 July 1977, following the latter's confirmation as Prime Minister of Spain by King Juan Carlos I on 17 June, as a result of the Union of the Democratic Centre (UCD) emerging as the largest parliamentary force at the 1977 general election.

Suárez's second cabinet was initially made up by independents and members from the political parties that had run within the UCD alliance, most of whom would end up joining it upon its transformation into a full-fledged political party. It was automatically dismissed on 2 March 1979 as a consequence of the 1979 general election, but remained in acting capacity until the next government was sworn in.

Cabinet changes
Suárez's second government saw a number of cabinet changes during its tenure:

On 1 September 1977, the Ministry of Culture and Welfare was renamed as Ministry of Culture, with a restructuring of the ministerial department that saw some of its competences transferred to other ministries, such as the Ministry of Foreign Affairs.
On 27 September 1977, Ignacio Camuñas stepped down as Deputy Minister of Relations with the Cortes, without portfolio, over political discrepancies on the UCD's composition as a unitary political party. After his resignation, Camuñas's office was discontinued.
On 11 February 1978, Leopoldo Calvo-Sotelo was appointed to the newly created post of Minister of Relations with the European Communities, without portfolio.
On 25 February 1978, a major cabinet reshuffle resulting from the resignation of Enrique Fuentes Quintana saw Fernando Abril Martorell being reassigned as new Second Deputy Prime Minister and Minister of Economy; Manuel Jiménez de Parga was replaced as Minister of Labour by Rafael Calvo Ortega; Agustín Rodríguez Sahagún replaced Alberto Oliart in the Ministry of Industry and Energy; Jaime Lamo de Espinosa became new Minister of Agriculture in place of José Enrique Martínez Genique; and the Ministry of Transport and Communications saw the change from José Lladó to Salvador Sánchez-Terán.
On 23 March 1979, Landelino Lavilla was elected President of the Congress of Deputies of the 1st Legislature, a position incompatible with his post as acting Minister of Justice. Rodolfo Martín Villa, acting Minister of the Interior, took on the ordinary duties of the affairs of Lavilla's vacant ministry.

Council of Ministers
The Council of Ministers was structured into the offices for the prime minister, the three deputy prime ministers and 18 ministries, including a number of deputy ministers without portfolio. From February 1978, the council would only include two deputy prime ministers.

Notes

References

Bibliography

External links
Governments. Juan Carlos I (20.11.1975 ...). CCHS-CSIC (in Spanish).
Governments of Spain 1977–1982. Ministers of Adolfo Suárez and Leopoldo Calvo-Sotelo. Historia Electoral.com (in Spanish).
The governments of the Union of the Democratic Centre (1977–1982). Lluís Belenes i Rodríguez History Page (in Spanish).

1977 establishments in Spain
1979 disestablishments in Spain
Cabinets established in 1977
Cabinets disestablished in 1979
Council of Ministers (Spain)